Happiness is a British sitcom written by Paul Whitehouse and David Cummings, with Whitehouse starring in the lead role.

Two series were broadcast on BBC Two in 2001 and 2003. Whitehouse stated that there would not be a third.

Synopsis
Whitehouse plays Danny Spencer, a successful voice artist for a popular cartoon bear called Dexter. Spencer is trying to come to terms with the death of his wife, though much of his concern is that he finds he isn't feeling the loss as deeply as he should.

Approaching his 40th birthday he is independent and single and the programme's themes are largely bound up with the opportunities and problems that this situation creates. His friends are a disparate group, ranging from the strait-laced Terry and Rachel (Mark Heap, Fiona Allen), through the down and outs - Charlie and Sid (Johnny Vegas and Pearce Quigley), to the archetypal man in a mid-life crisis, Angus (Clive Russell). To varying degrees these friends offer Spencer inspiration and cautionary tales as to how Spencer can fill his life.

Episodes

Series 1

Series 2

Awards
British Comedy Awards, 2001
Won
Johnny Vegas, best newcomer for his role as Charlie.
Nominations
Best TV Comedy drama.
British Academy Television Awards, 2002
Nominations
Situation comedy award.

Critical reception
Simon Hoggart described the series as "part of that newish genre, the situation tragedy", and Andrew Billen criticised it for the "emptiness at its heart and not enough going on peripherally to make up for it". Nicholas Barber described it as "an impressive leap from catchphrase-heavy sketch comedy" with "topnotch supporting actors". Many reviews identified Johnny Vegas's performance as being the strongest among the cast.

References

External links
 

2001 British television series debuts
2003 British television series endings
2000s British sitcoms
BBC television sitcoms
English-language television shows
Television shows set in England